Apollinaris of Ravenna (Apollinarios, Late Latin: Apolenaris) is a Syrian saint, whom the Roman Martyrology describes as "a bishop who, according to tradition, while spreading among the nations the unsearchable riches of Christ, led his flock as a good shepherd and honoured the Church of Classis near Ravenna by a glorious martyrdom."

Biography
It is not certain what was his native place, though it was probably Antioch in the Roman Province of Syria. It is not certain that he was one of the seventy-two disciples of Christ, as has been suggested, but he was apparently a disciple of Saint Peter, who may have consecrated and commissioned him as the first Bishop of Ravenna during the reign of the Emperor Claudius, the fourth Roman emperor from 41 to 54 A.D. The precise date of his consecration as Bishop cannot be ascertained. He dedicated himself to the work of evangelization in Emilia-Romagna.  During his twenty-six year tenure as bishop of Ravenna, he faced nearly constant persecution.

Christian inscriptions dating from the 2nd century have been discovered near Classe, confirming the presence of Christianity in Ravenna at a very early date. According to the list of the bishops of Ravenna compiled by Bishop Marianus (546-556), the 12th Bishop of Ravenna was named Severus; and he is among those who signed at the Council of Sardica in 343. Thus, the epoch of Saint Apollinaris may be estimated as possibly to the last decades of the 2nd century, placing his martyrdom possibly under Emperor Septimius Severus.

The Passio Sancti Apollinaris presents historical difficulties. It was probably written by Archbishop Maurus of Ravenna (642-671), who presumably wanted to demonstrate the early origin of his see and a connection to Saint Peter, in an effort to achieve a degree of autonomy from Rome. (In 666 Emperor Constans II granted the request of Bishop Maurus, allowing Ravenna to consecrate its bishop without approval from Rome, and declared that the Pope had no jurisdiction over the Archbishop of Ravenna, since that city was the seat of the exarch, his immediate representative.)

Traditional narrative
The miracles Apollinaris wrought soon attracted official attention, for they and his preaching won many converts to the Faith, while at the same time bringing upon him the fury of the idolaters, who beat him cruelly and drove him from the city. He was found half-dead on the seashore, and kept in concealment by the Christians, but was captured again and compelled to walk on burning coals and a second time expelled. But he remained in the vicinity, and continued his work of evangelization.

He then journeyed to Aemilia. A third time he returned to Ravenna. Again he was captured, beaten and tortured, and flung into a dungeon, loaded with chains, to starve to death; but after four days he was put on board a ship and sent to Greece. There the same course of preachings, miracles, and sufferings continued; and when his very presence caused the oracles to be silent, he was, after a cruel beating, sent back to Italy.

All this continued for three years, and a fourth time he returned to Ravenna. By this time Vespasian was Emperor, and he, in answer to the complaints of the pagans, issued a decree of banishment against the Christians. Apollinaris was kept concealed for some time, but as he was passing out of the gates of the city, was set upon and savagely beaten, probably at Classis, a suburb, but he lived for seven days, foretelling meantime that the persecutions would increase, but that the Church would ultimately triumph.

Veneration
His movement quickly spread beyond the city limits. Popes Simmachus (498-514) and Honorius I (625-638) encouraged its spread to Rome, while the Frankish king Clovis dedicated a church to Apollinaris near Dijon. In Germany it probably spread thanks to the Benedictine and Camaldolese monasteries. A church was also dedicated to him in Bologna in the area of the Palazzo del Podestà, but was demolished in 1250.

Feast day
In the Tridentine Calendar his feast day is July 23, the day he is alleged to have been martyred. The present General Roman Calendar devotes this day to Saint Bridget of Sweden, since it is also the day she died and she is now better known in the West than Saint Apollinaris, being one of the patron saints of Europe. Owing to the limited importance of Saint Apollinaris' feast worldwide, his liturgical celebration was in 1969 removed from the General Roman Calendar, but not from the Roman Martyrology, the official list of saints. His memorial was restored to the General Roman Calendar in the 2002 edition of the Roman Missal, with the date of celebration changed to July 20, the nearest day not taken up with other celebrations. The Roman Martyrology mentions Saint Apollinaris both on July 20 (with the above-quoted text) and also more briefly on July 23.

Relics

His relics were held at the Basilica of Sant'Apollinare in Classe, on the traditional site of his martyrdom. In 856, they were transferred to the Basilica of Sant'Apollinare Nuovo in Ravenna because of the threat posed by frequent pirate raids along the Adriatic coast. Additional relics are housed at the Apollinariskirche, Remagen.

There are churches dedicated to him in Aachen, and Burtscheid and in Germany, where his veneration was probably spread by Benedictine monks. The Frankish king Clovis built a church dedicated to him in Dijon, and another dedicated to Saint Apollinaris also existed in Bologna, but was destroyed in 1250. Bořivoj II, Duke of Bohemia, founded a church with a collegiate chapter dedicated to Saint Apollinaris in Sadská (then an important centre of the Czech state) in 1117/1118. On behalf of Charles IV, Holy Roman Emperor, the chapter was later transferred from Sadská to recently founded New Town of Prague in 1362 and another church of St Apollinaris built there. Both of these churches in Bohemia stand to the present time. In 1957, a church venerating St. Apollinaris was founded in Napa, California.

Patronage
Apollinaris is the patron saint of Ravenna, and Emilia-Romagna. A noted miracle worker, Saint Apollinaris is considered especially effective against gout, venereal disease and epilepsy.

Iconography
Saint Apollinarus is represented with a pastoral staff, palm, and pallium. The story of Saint Apollinaris is told in stained glass in the Cathédrale Saint-Pierre-et-Saint-Paul de Troyes.

Notes

References

Sources
Nicholas Everett, Patron Saints of Early Medieval Italy AD c.350-800 (PIMS/Durham University Press, 2016), pp139-170.

External links
American Catholic - Saint of the Day: St Apollinaris
"Here Followeth the Life of St. Appolinaris" from the Caxton translation of the Golden Legend

1st-century births
1st-century Christian martyrs
1st-century Romans
79 deaths
Bishops of Ravenna
Saints from Roman Italy
Saints from Roman Syria